Pizzarelli is a surname. Notable people with the surname include:

 Alan Pizzarelli (born 1950), American poet, songwriter and musician
 Bucky Pizzarelli (born 1926), American musician
 John Pizzarelli (born 1960), American musician
 Martin Pizzarelli (born 1963), American musician

See also
 Pizzarello

Italian-language surnames